Yule Love Story is a drama series aired on Zee TV from 1993 to 1994. In every episode a new story was shown, which was a typical love story revolving around relation between teens. This series was succeeded by another series called Rishtey that involves all the human relationship not just love between couples. The series was sponsored by Yule Tea Group.

Indian television soap operas
Zee TV original programming
1993 Indian television series debuts
1995 Indian television series endings
Indian anthology television series
Indian romance television series